Kevin Eugene Allen (born June 21, 1963) is a former professional American football tackle who played in the National Football League for one season for the Philadelphia Eagles.

Allen is an alumnus of Northwest High School in Cincinnati and of Indiana University.

NFL banning
Allen's career started against the New York Giants, a game where the Giants recorded eight sacks. By midseason, Allen was relegated to Special Teams. During the offseason, Allen moved to the center position. Eagles coach Buddy Ryan thought so little of Allen that he once described him as someone who could only be useful "if you want someone to stand around and kill the grass... he looks like a USFL reject." In 2011, Deadspin ranked Allen the fourth-worst NFL player of all time, noting "The ninth overall pick out of Indiana had a special way of blocking opposing pass rushers. He would lean his body forward, then fall down." and "Never had the Eagles had a combination of bad person-bad player that could match this guy." When Kevin Allen missed practice due to being treated at a local hospital for dehydration, when Buddy Ryan was interviewed about him missing practice 'You mean the General?' he said when asked about Allen's whereabouts. 'You know we all call him the General, don't you? For General Hospital.

After a poor rookie season, Allen tested positive for cocaine after reporting to Eagles training camp in 1986. The Eagles released him in October 1986. Days after being cut, Allen and his roommate, Scott Cartwright, were charged with rape. Allen was sentenced to 15 years in prison, serving 33 months in prison, while Cartwright was sentenced to seven years. He was banned from the league for life soon afterward.

In the spring of 1991, Allen's ban was lifted. After failed tryouts with the Cincinnati Bengals and the San Francisco 49ers, the Kansas City Chiefs signed Allen in 1991, assigning him to the Orlando Thunder in the WLAF. He became the Thunder's starting right tackle for the 1992 season, recording at least 16 pancake blocks.

Allen would later move on to the Arena Football League, playing for three teams.

References

1963 births
Living people
Players of American football from Cincinnati
American football offensive tackles
American football centers
American people convicted of rape
Indiana Hoosiers football players
Philadelphia Eagles players
Kansas City Chiefs players
Orlando Thunder players
Cincinnati Rockers players
Charlotte Rage players
Miami Hooters players
American sportspeople convicted of crimes